Elizabeth R. Cantwell (born May 26, 1955) is Senior Vice President for Research and Innovation at the University of Arizona. She is a elected fellow of the American Association for the Advancement of Science.

Education 
Cantwell has a B.A. in Human Behavior from the University of Chicago (1976). In 1992, she received her PhD in Mechanical Engineering from the University of California, Berkeley. In 2003, she earned an MBA in Finance & Entrepreneurship from the University of Pennsylvania, Wharton School.

Career 
Cantwell worked for the Lawrence Livermore National Laboratory, where she was director for economic development and focused on developing research programs for the U.S. Department of Defense. From 2015 to 2019, she was at Arizona State University. As of 2021, Cantwell is an American professor of aerospace-mechanical engineering and the senior vice president for research and Innovation at The University of Arizona in Tucson, Arizona. She oversees twelve major university research centers and facilities, including Biosphere 2, Bio5 Institute, Arizona State Museum, and the Udall Center for Studies in Public Policy.

Awards and honors 
She was elected as a fellow of the American Association for the Advancement of Science in 2019. In 2020, she was presented with the Transformational Leadership Award at the Arizona Governor's Celebration of Innovation Awards.

References 

Fellows of the American Association for the Advancement of Science
University of Arizona faculty
University of Chicago alumni
University of California, Berkeley alumni
University of Pennsylvania alumni
Living people
21st-century American women
1955 births